Fu Tinggui (born August 1944) is a general of the People's Liberation Army of the People's Republic of China. He served as the political commissar in PLA Beijing Military Region since 2003 until 2009.

Biography 
Born in Panshan, Manchukuo, Fu joined the army in December 1963 and joined Chinese Communist Party (CCP) in April 1966.

From September 1985 to July 1988, he studied in basic department of PLA National Defense University. In August 1991, he was promoted to director of political department of Jilin provincial military region. From August 1994 to July 2001, he was political commissar of an army group. He studied at CCP Central Party School from August 1992 to December 1994, majoring in economics management. From March - July 2001, he was enrolled in a training program for senior officials at PLA National Defense University. From July 2001 to December 2003, he was director of political department and a standing committee member of CCP committee in Beijing Military Region. Since December 2003, he has been serving as political commissar of Beijing MR. 

Fu was made major general in July 1994, lieutenant general in July 2002, and general on June 24 2006.

He was a member of 16th CCP and 17th Central Committee.

References

1944 births
People's Liberation Army generals from Liaoning
Living people
Politicians from Panjin
PLA National Defence University alumni
Central Party School of the Chinese Communist Party alumni
Chinese Communist Party politicians from Liaoning
People's Republic of China politicians from Liaoning
Political commissars of the Beijing Military Region